Mairwa community development block(CD Block) or Mairwa Block is a notified area (Community development block) in Siwan district in the Indian state of Bihar. It is one out of 13 blocks of Siwan Subdivision.

Mairwa city is the headquarter of this block.

Panchayats in Mairwa block
The block is divided into one Nagar Panchayat (urban) and many Gram Panchayats. (rural)
 Mairwa Nagar Panchayat (city council)
Babhanauli
Bargaon
Barka manjha
English (village council)
Kabirpur
Muriyari
Semara
Sewatapur

Villages in Mairwa
Some villages of Mairwa block in different Panchayats:
 Sumerpur
 Kaithwali
 Baraso
 Bargaon
 Bilaspur
 Bhopatpura
 Kabirpur, Siwan, Bihar
 Kabita
 Parasia
 Pipra
 Mairwa Dham
 Anugrah Nagar
 Shemra
 Lakshmipur
 Englis
 Nawada,Babhnauli Panchayat

Geography 
Mairwa, situated in the western part of Bihar, bordering Indian state of Uttar Pradesh, was originally a block of Siwan district, approximately 20 km away from Siwan which in ancient days formed a part of Kosala Kingdom. It is geographically situated at 25º35 North and 84º1 to 84º20 East. Mairwa is bounded on the east by the Siwan district headquarters, on the north by Gopalganj district and on the west and south by two districts of Uttar Pradesh viz. Deoria and Ballia.

Educational institutions 
 Hari Ram High SchooL
 Hari Ram College
 Government Middle School
 Kanya High School
 Project High School
 I.T.I College
 M.S. College
Rama Institute of Technical Degree College
 Town high school

References 

Community development blocks in Siwan district